Yesterday) is an EP of South Korean singer Kim Junsu, released under his stage name Xia on 19 October 2015. The first music video was released for the title song of the same name. The album contains eight tracks, three of which are acoustic versions of previously released songs.

Track list

Charts

References

2015 EPs
Kakao M EPs
Korean-language EPs
Kim Junsu albums
K-pop EPs